The Canton of Besançon-Planoise is a former administrative division in the departement of Doubs and in Franche-Comté region. It had 20,407 inhabitants (2012). It was disbanded following the French canton reorganisation which came into effect in March 2015. It consisted of three areas of Besançon: Planoise, Tilleroyes and Châteaufarine.

In 2008, Barbara Romagnan (PS) became representative of the canton with 70% of the votes, front of Martine Bultot (Far left) who obtained just 30% of the votes.

History 

Planoise, with 20,700 inhabitants is the bigger area of the canton of Besançon-Planoise.

Tilleroyes is a little area, located in the north of the city.

Châteaufarine is a commercial area, located in the west of Besançon and near Planoise.

Politics

See also 
 Arrondissement of Besançon

References 

Besancon
Planoise
2015 disestablishments in France
States and territories disestablished in 2015